Nathon is a neighbourhood in Ko Samui, Thailand. It is located on the island west coast and is the seat of district officials. Once the town has been the leading urban and economy center of the Ko Samui due to its fishing and coconut industry and now it still preserves its typical local character.

Nathon is very famous with its picturesque sunset views as well as its street food markets.

References

External link

Populated places in Surat Thani province